Essex County, Ontario County Council Elections were held on October 27, 2014 in conjunction with municipal elections across the province.

Essex County Council
Essex County Council consists of the 7 mainland mayors of Essex County and their seven deputy mayors. Pelee Island is considered a "separate township," and is not represented on County council but is included on this list.

Amherstburg

Essex

Kingsville

Lakeshore

LaSalle

Leamington

Tecumseh

Pelee (separated township)

References

AMO - 2014 Municipal Election Results

Essex
Essex County, Ontario